Auriesville is a hamlet in the northeastern part of the Town of Glen in Montgomery County, New York, United States, along the south bank of the Mohawk River and west of Fort Hunter. It lies about forty miles west of Albany, the state capital. A Jesuit cemetery is located there, as French Jesuits founded a mission village at Ossernenon from 1667 until 1684, when the Mohawk destroyed it. Auries is said to have been the name of the last Mohawk known to have lived there. Settlers named the village after him.

Since the late 19th century, a Catholic tradition developed associating Auriesville with the site of the Mohawk village Ossernenon, where Jesuit missionaries were martyred in 1642 and 1646. The National Shrine of the North American Martyrs was built here in 1930 and has added to its grounds. But, according to Dean R. Snow and other late 20th-century archeologists specializing in Native American history, Ossernenon was located about 9 miles west on a tributary on the south side of the Mohawk River. Archeologists who have excavated there refer to it as the Bauder site.  The association of Auriesville with Ossernenon has not been supported by archeological evidence.

History
Auriesville, located in Montgomery County, has been said to have developed at the presumed site of the Mohawk village known as Ossernenon. But, according to Dean R. Snow, it was not until the late nineteenth-century that this Catholic tradition developed. It is disproved by archeological evidence discovered by Snow, Donald A. Rumrill, and other 20th-century archeologists who assert that Ossernenon was located approximately nine  miles west of Auriesville on a tributary south of the Mohawk River. The archeological site associated with the former village of Ossernenon is known as the Bauder site.

Catholic historians wanted to establish the location of the deaths of three Jesuit Catholics who were martyred in the 1640s by the Mohawk, as well as others held and ritually tortured by the tribe. Ossernenon was also known as the birthplace of Kateri Tekawitha, whose reputation as a Mohawk virgin had grown since the 17th century. In 2012, she was canonized, with the distinction of being the first Native American so honored. More than 2,000 Indians, the majority of them Mohawk, from both the United States and Canada traveled to Rome for the canonization.

Archeologists have identified the Mohawk village of Caughnawaga (also spelled Gandawaga), where Tekakwitha lived during her childhood, as a new village site on the north side of the river, founded in 1659. Caughnawaga was settled at what archeologists refer to as the Freeman site; as was their custom, its Mohawk residents took the name with them also when they moved the village to the nearby Fox Farm site. Excavations have supported conclusions of Mohawk settlement here. The sites are both to the west of present-day Fonda.

The Jesuits developed a mission village known as Caughnawaga and later spelled as Kahnawake, reflecting Mohawk pronunciation. The Jesuit's founded the mission in 1718 for Iroquois and other converts to Catholicism. Most residents were Mohawk. Today, Kahnawake is recognized as a Mohawk  Indian reserve within the boundaries of Quebec.

Mohawk village of Ossernenon
The Mohawk village of Ossernenon was destroyed in a punitive raid in retribution for the killing of French missionaries ca. 1666, after which its exact locus became uncertain, but which subsequent research placed approximately  nine miles west of the current hamlet of Auriesville.  The French Jesuit missionaries Saint René Goupil, Saint Isaac Jogues, and Saint Jean de Lalande, were martyred by the Mohawk at Ossernenon: Goupil in 1642 and Jogues and LaLande in 1646. Ossernenon was located south of the Mohawk River, about nine miles to the west of present-day Auriesville. Taken captive in Canada by Mohawk warriors, Jogues and Goupil were brought as prisoners in 1642 to Ossernenon. They were ritually tortured and then enslaved by the Mohawk. Goupil was killed later in 1642. After several months, Jogues was ransomed by Dutch traders from Fort Orange (Albany), with the aid of Protestant minister Johannes Megapolensis, who had good relations with the Mohawk. Jogues sailed down the Hudson River to return to France by way of New Amsterdam.

In 1644, François-Joseph Bressani was ritually tortured by Mohawk at Ossernenon after being taken captive. Later on, Joseph Poncet also suffered that treatment. Jogues returned to Quebec as a missionary. In late September 1646, he set out for Ossernenon on a peace mission to the Mohawk with Lalande, a young Jesuit lay brother. Jogues was killed on October 18, 1646. Lalande was killed the next day while trying to recover his colleague's body from the village path.

From 1655 to 1658, Father Simon Le Moyne reported traveling a number of times to Ossernenon from Quebec as an ambassador to negotiate peace with the Mohawk. Many Mohawk left Ossernenon, establishing a new village circa 1659, which they called Caughnawaga, on the north side of the Mohawk River. As noted above, archeologists have correlated references to this with evidence found at what are known as the Freeman and Fox Farm sites.

In 1666, the Marquis de Tracy conducted a punitive expedition against the Mohawk, destroying Ossernenon and their two other villages on the south side of the river. The French forced the Mohawk to agree to accept Jesuit missionaries. In the next years, the French established a permanent Jesuit mission at what developed as Auriesville. Father Boniface, James de Lamberville, Jacques Frémin, Bruyas, Jean Pierron and others laboured here until 1684, when the Mohawk destroyed the mission.

The exact location of Ossernenon, closely associated with the founding of Catholicism in present-day New York, was debated by scholars. After its destruction by French forces in the 1660s, the site gradually was lost. Nineteenth-century historians, such as John Gilmary Shea and Gen. J. S. Clarke of Auburn disagreed over the location. They concluded that the present Auriesville is where Father Jogues and his companions were martyred in the 1640s. They based this on documentation describing Ossernenon as being on the south side of the Mohawk and west of Schoharie Creek, as is Auriesville. They thought they established it from contemporary maps, and from the letters of Jogues, Bressani, and Poncet.

Joliet had put the village of Ossernenon at the confluence of the Schoharie and Mohawk rivers. Jogues described the ravine in which Goupil's body was found, with features which people believed they recognized in the 19th century. Lastly, Jogues gave the distances from the Mohawk villages of Andagaron and Tionontoguen, by which the historians figured the site. As noted above, based on extensive archeological work and analysis of historic documents, late 20th-century ethnohistorians and archeologists disagree with this conclusion. They have established that Ossernenon was located nine miles west of Auriesville at what they call the Bauder site, also on a tributary of the Mohawk river.

Commemoration
In 1884, the Rev. Joseph Loyzance, S.J., then parish priest of St. Joseph's, Troy, New York, purchased  of land on the hill at Auriesville.  A student of the lives of the early missionaries, Father Loyzance erected a small shrine under the title of Our Lady of Martyrs.  He was the first to lead a number of pilgrims to the place, on 15 August of that year. It was the Feast of the Assumption, as well as the anniversary of when Father Isaac Jogues was first taken as a Mohawk captive to Ossernenon in 1642. Four thousand people went on a pilgrimage from Albany and Troy to Auriesville on that day.

Other Catholic parishes subsequently adopted the practice of visiting Auriesville during the summer. Frequently there were as many as 4,000 to 5,000 people gathered there. Many of the pilgrims would fast for their journey, pray and receive Holy Communion there. The Catholic Church purchased and consecrated more ground to keep the surroundings free from undesirable development. Following the canonization of St. Isaac Jogues in 1930, the church built the National Shrine of the North American Martyrs at this site, recognizing other Jesuit martyrs from the French colonial period. It built a large coliseum-sanctuary on the grounds, with seating for up to 6000 worshipers.

See also
North American Martyrs
Early history of Upstate New York

References

Sources

External links
The (U.S.) National Shrine of the North American Martyrs
The (U.S.) National Kateri Shrine, in Fonda, New York

Hamlets in New York (state)
Hamlets in Montgomery County, New York
Populated places on the Mohawk River